Vijayawada, formerly known as Bezawada, is the second largest city in the Indian state of Andhra Pradesh and is a part of the state's Capital Region. It is the administrative headquarters of the NTR district. Its metropolitan region comprises NTR and parts of Krishna and Guntur districts.Vijayawada lies on the banks of Krishna river surrounded by the hills of Eastern Ghats, known as Indrakeeladri Hills. It geographically lies on the center spot of Andhra Pradesh. The city has been described as the commercial, political, cultural and educational capital of Andhra Pradesh It is the second largest city in Andhra Pradesh with a population of 1,723,000  in 2021, estimated population of 1,991,189 in the Vijayawada Metropolitan Area. It is one of the fastest growing urban areas in India  and among the top 10 fastest growing cities in the world according to Oxford Economics report. 

Vijayawada is considered to be a sacred place for residing one of the most visited and famous temples of Andhra Pradesh and India, Kanaka Durga Temple of Hindu Goddess Durga residing on the hill named Indrakeeladri. It also serves as the ritual host of Pushkaram (a river worshipping ritual in India) of River Krishna. There is a legend which says that Arjuna, one of the heroes of the Indian epic Mahabharata, prayed on top of the Indrakeeladri Hill in the city and won the blessings of Lord Shiva to get the Pashupatastra to win the Kurukshetra War. It was called Vijayavatika (meaning Land of Victory in Telugu) when Goddess Durga killed the demon Mahishasura and rested on the Indrakeeladri Hill by the River Krishna establishing the victory over evil hence the place got its name Vijayavatika, "Vijaya" meaning victory, and "Vatika" meaning place or land in Telugu. Over the years Vijayavatika name changed to Rajendra Chola Pura during Chola Dynasty and Bezawada during British rule and eventually to Vijayawada.

The city is also the third most densely populated urban built-up areas in the world. and is classified as a Y-grade city by the Sixth Central Pay Commission. The city is the second most populous in the state with a population of more than one million. It was recognised as a "Global City of the Future" by McKinsey Quarterly, which expected an increase to GDP of $17 billion by 2025. In October 2018, it was awarded with ISO 37120 platinum level certification and has been added to the "Global Cities Registry".

Due to the presence of several well-known educational institutions, the city has emerged as a major educational hub in recent times, with many of the nation's students studying in the city. It is predicted to be the world's, and India's, tenth fastest growing city economy through 2035 by an Oxford Economics report. Due to its high ratings in entertainment, construction, food, education, health care, and transport, It is ranked as India's ninth most livable city as per Ease of Living Index 2018, Ministry of Housing and Urban Affairs and the second most livable city in the state of Andhra Pradesh.

The Vijayawada Junction railway station is one of the busiest in the country. It stands as the tenth busiest railway junctions in the country.

Toponymy 
There are many legends behind the origin of the name Vijayawada. It is said that Goddess Durga killed Mahishasura and relaxed at this place. As she was victorious, the place came to be known as Vijayawada (vijaya translates to victory and wada as place, literally meaning The Place of Victory). The hill was called as Indrekeeladri since it was frequently visited by Indra and his affiliates. The epic Mahabharata refers to the Indrakiladri hills as the place where Arjuna secured Pashupatastra from Lord Shiva. One of the names of Arjuna is "Vijaya" (invincible). Thus city thereafter came to be known as Vijayavatika ('Vatika' translates to place in Telugu) and later as Vijayawada.

In some legends, Vijayawada was referred to as Rajendracholapura as Virarajendra Chola won a battle against Chalukyas in 1068 and ruled over this place. A tale behind its acquiring the name Bezawada is that Goddess Krishnaveni (River Krishna) requested Arjuna to make a passage for her to merge into the Bay of Bengal. Hence, Arjuna made a bejjam (hole) through the mountains and the place came to be known as Bejjamwada which later changed to Bezawada. Other names of Vijayawada were being Vijayavata, Beejapuram, Kanakaprabha, Kanakapuram, Kanakawada, Jayapuri, Vijayapuri, Phalguna Kshetram and Jananathpura in the twelfth century CE.

History 

Bezawada (as Vijayawada was known then) was founded around 626 A.D. by Paricchedi Kings. Vijayawada history reveals that Bezawada (Vijayawada) was ruled by King Madhava Varma (one of the kings of Vishnukundina dynasty). Chinese Buddhist scholar Xuanzang stayed a few years in Bezawada (Vijayawada) in around 640 A.D. to copy and study the Abhidhamma Pitaka, the last of the three pitakas (Pali for baskets) constituting the Pali canon, the scriptures of Theravada Buddhism.

Mogalrajapuram hills have five rock-cut temples, built during the fourth–ninth centuries. Some of the caves can be attributed to Vishnukundina dynasty. Akkana Madanna Caves, at the foot of Indrakeeladri Hill, is a monument of national importance.

At the foot of Indrakeeladri hills is the temple of Malleswara. The temple has inscriptions dating back to ninth century AD to 16th century AD by various kings. There are ten pillars and a mutilated slab (recognised as monuments by Archaeological Survey of India) with inscriptions in the Telugu language. Of them, the inscriptions issued by Yudhamalla I and II of Eastern Chalukyas are important.

In the early 16th century, during the reign of Qutb Shahi dynasty (also known as Golconda Sultanate), diamond mines were found near Vijayawada on the banks of Krishna River.

Geography 

Three canals originating from the north side of the Prakasam Barrage reservoir — Eluru, Bandar, and Ryves — flow through the city.

Climate 

Vijayawada has a tropical wet and dry climate (Köppen Aw). May is the hottest and January is the coldest month of the year.

Demographics 
The city is the second most populous in the state and the third most densely populated urban built-up areas in the world, with approximately 31,200 people per square km.  Census of India, it had a population of 1,021,806, of which males are 524,918 and females are 523,322 — for a sex ratio of 997 females per 1000 males — higher than the national average of 940 per 1000. 92,848 children were in the age group of 0–6 years, of which 47,582 were boys and 45,266 were girls: a ratio of 951 per 1000. The average literacy rate stood at 82.59% (male 86.25%; female 78.94%) with 789,038 literates, significantly higher than the national average of 73.00%.

Language and religion 

The predominant language spoken by the city residents is Telugu. Telugu is spoken by  speakers, followed by  Urdu. A significant minority speak Hindi, Tamil, Odia, Gujarati, Marathi and Malayalam. It constituted  Hindus (85.16%),  Muslims (9.12%),  Christians (3.64%),  Jains (0.50%) and  (1.59%) did not state any religion.

Governance

Civic administration 

Vijayawada Municipal Corporation is the civic governing body of the city and was the first ISO 9001 certified urban local body in the country.

It was constituted on 1 April 1888 and was upgraded to selection grade municipality in 1960, and, to the corporation in 1981. The present Municipal Commissioner of the city is Sri V. Prasanna Venkatesh, IAS and the present Mayor is Rayana Bhagya Lakshmi. Vijayawada is the headquarters of Andhra Pradesh Capital Region Development Authority.

As per the G.O. 104 (dated:23-03-2017), the state government had declared Vijayawada Municipal Corporation and its contiguous areas as a metropolitan area of Vijayawada. The metropolitan area covers Vijayawada municipal corporation and merged villages of Ambapuram, Buddavaram, Done Atkuru, Enikepadu, Ganguru, Gannavaram, Gollapudi, Gudavalli, Jakkampudi, Kanuru, Kesarapalle, Nidamanuru, Nunna, Pathapadu, Penamaluru, Phiryadi Nainavaram, Poranki, Prasadampadu, Ramavarappadu, Tadigadapa, Kankipadu, Vuyyuru, Katuru, Bollapadu, Mudunuru and Yanamalakuduru. The urban agglomeration spread in Guntur district covers Tadepalle Municipality and its outgrowth of Undavalli; Mangalagiri Municipality and its outgrowths of Navuluru and Atmakur.

Utility services 

Water supply from the 59 water reservoirs, maintenance of roads, sewerage, underground drainage, environment protection programs, recycling of solid waste and producing power are the services provided by the Vijayawada Municipal Corporation. There has been an underground drainage system in the city since 1967–68. Many green parks are maintained by the corporation to protect the environment such as Raghavaiah park, Rajiv Gandhi Park, Dr. B.R Ambedkar Park, Mahatma Gandhi Park etc. The corporation won many awards and achievements such as National Urban Water Award (2009), Siti e-Governance Project, ISO 9001 certification for Quality Management System.

The Andhra Pradesh State Disaster Response and Fire Services Department with its headquarters in the city is responsible for protecting from fire accidents that occur during summers on the hill slope areas of the city.

Pollution control 
The report on solid waste generation in 46 metro cities for the year 2015–16 shows Vijayawada produces 550 tonnes of solid waste per day. Vijayawada is one of the cities to be covered under the Solar/Green Cities scheme launched by the Ministry of New and Renewable Energy and is one of the 15 cities in the country listed in Pilot Solar Cities.

In 2007, the Andhra Pradesh State Road Transport Corporation (APSRTC) that operates the city's public transport system introduced less-polluting CNG fueled public transport busses in a drive to reduce the operational cost and protect the environment. In 2019, with the cost of CNG and fleet maintenance on the rise, the APSRTC had begun replacing the CNG run busses with BS4 and BS6 standard diesel-fueled buses. However, APSRTC continues to be committed to alternative fuels for its fleet. It has since added more electric, and biodiesel fueled busses.

Likewise, the city has a large number of CNG fueled auto-rickshaws that support public transportation needs. However, auto-rickshaw operators have frequently suffered disruption in CNG supply and usually endure long queues to refuel. In February 2020, Piaggio Vehicles Private Limited launched the sale of electric auto-rickshaws in the city.

Law and order 

The present Police commissioner is Bathini Sreenivasulu.

Economy 

Vijayawada is one of the rapidly growing urban markets of the country. The sectors that contribute to the city economy are construction, education, entertainment, food processing, hospitality, registrations, transport, etc. Based on the recommendations of the Sixth Central Pay Commission, it is classified as one of the Y-grade cities of India. According to one study, the GDP of the city in 2010 was $3 billion (Rs. 18,000 crore) and is expected to grow up to $17 billion (Rs. 1,02,000 crore) by 2025. According to another by Oxford the GDP of the city in 2018 was $5.8 billion and is expected to grow up to $21 billion by 2035.

Andhra Cements (1937) was the first cement factory in Andhra Pradesh. Siris Pharmaceuticals was the first pharma company in Andhra Pradesh and was established in 1950.

The city has trading and exporting markets for agriculture and industrial goods. The Nunna Mango Market is one of the largest mango markets in Asia, exporting to major cities in the country. It is also a hub for storage, bottling, and transportation of petroleum products of all major companies like BPCL, HPCL, and IOC.

The city is also attracting many international IT companies. HCL Technologies, Wipro, the Noida-based Indian multinational is constructing its Vijayawada campus in Kesarapalli village, near to Gannavaram. In the first phase, HCL will provide employment to 5,000 students.

There are two major IT parks one at Gannavaram and other in Mangalagiri there are big companies like TechMahindra, HCL, PI Data Center, VSoft, Efftronics, KJ Systems, and EPSoft. The city is also most preferred tier-two city destination for IT/ITES services. There is an APIIC Mega Food Park in Mandavalli near Gannavaram.

The growing population and economy have resulted in rising real estate prices. There is also a cyber security office that is operating by Tech mahindra.And the 
Wonderla an amusement park is trying to invest around 250 crores rupees to expand its branch in between guntur and vijayawada in 50 acres.

Culture 

The city is known in the state for its cultural history, whose residents are more often referred to as Vijayawadians. There are many religions, languages, traditions, and festivals. Durga Pooja and a special Theppotsavam in Krishna river are important events of the Hindu festival of Dussera in the city, mainly due to the existence of self-manifested Kanaka Durga Temple. Hazarat Bal Mosque is a Muslim shrine housing the holy relic of the Prophet Mohammed. The Gunadala Mary Matha Church is an important shrine for Christians and illuminates during Christmas Eve.

The city corporation organises "Happy Sunday," an event organised on the first Sunday of every month at M.G. Road for promoting activities such as sports, games, cultural events, and yoga. The clothing of the locals includes traditional men wearing dhoti and women wearing saree and salwar kameez. western clothing is also predominant.

Arts, crafts and artefacts 

The Vijayawada Art Society promotes Telugu arts. The city hosted Poetic Prism 2015, a multilingual poet's meet on 19 September 2015. All these activities are organised in collaboration with the Cultural Centre of Vijayawada. Kondapalli Toys — which were granted geographical indication in 2007 — are handmade by the artisans of Kondapalli, a suburb of Vijayawada. Victoria Jubilee Museum is an archaeological museum in the city, which houses sculptures, paintings, and artefacts of Buddhist and Hindu relics, dating back to the second and third centuries.

Cityscape 

Vijayawada was paired as a sister city of Modesto, California in 1993. The city has old and new town areas. The One Town area of the city is known as old city area, comprising areas such as Islampet, Jendachettu Centre, Kamsalipet, Rajarajeswaripet, Kothapet, Ajith Singh Nagar, and Winchipet. The new city areas include areas such as Autonagar, Benz circle, Chuttugunta, Labbipet, Machavaram Down, Mogalrajapuram, NTR circle, Tikkle Road, Governorpeta, Pinnamaneni Polyclinic Road and Suryaraopet.

Brindavan Colony, Commercial Taxes Colony, Gunadala, Veterinary Colony are some of the residential areas. Bank Colony, Bharati Nagar, Gayatri Nagar, Currency Nagar, Satyanarayana Puram, Gurunanak Colony, APIIC Colony, LIC Colony, Patamata and MG Road are the upscale residential areas. The major commercial areas include the stretch of MG Road and from Benz Circle to Ramavarappadu Ring. Other commercial centers are Besant Road, Rajagopalachari street, One Town market area covering Kaleswara Rao Market (KR Market), and Vastralatha.

Transport

Public transport 
The primary modes of intra-city public transport are city buses and auto rickshaws. Apart from these, other means of transport are motorcycles, cycle rickshaws, and bicycles. The Pandit Nehru Bus Station and the Vijayawada Junction railway station are the major transport infrastructure for road and rail transport. The Pandit Nehru bus station is the administrative headquarters of APSRTC, which is ranked as the fourth largest and busiest bus terminals in the country. The City Division of APSRTC operates close to 450 buses for an average of 300,000 daily commuting passengers. Autonagar bus terminus and city bus port is used for city bus services. The city buses ply in major routes of Besant Road, Eluru Road, MG Road and to the city outskirts of Ibrahimpatnam, Kondapalli, Mangalagiri, Kankipadu, Uyyuru, Gannavaram, Nidamanuru and Nunna. In 2016, APSRTS has discontinued city services on the BRTS corridor due to poor response from the commuters.

Road 
The two major National Highways, NH-16 (Kolkata–Bhubaneshwar-Visakhapatnam-Vijayawada-Guntur-Nellore-Chennai) and NH-65 (Pune-Hyderabad-Suryapet-Vijayawada-Machilipatnam), provides road connectivity with other states and major cities. National Highway 30 from Jagdalpur of Chhattisgarh terminates near the city suburb of Ibrahimpatnam. The Inner Ring Road connects NH-16 and NH-65 to serve the main purpose of easing traffic congestion.

The seamless commuting in the city is supported by the presence of 16 bridges across the three canals of Bandar, Eluru, and Ryves. M. G. Road (Bandar Road) and Eluru Road are the major arterial roads of the city, with as many as 90,000 vehicles plying M. G. Road itself. The heavy vehicles like lorries are used for freight transport and hold a share of 18% in the country. Short distance commuting is served by 27,296 auto rickshaws plying the city roads every day, which include the women-driven 'She Autos' as well. Benz Circle is one of the busiest road junctions in the city with an average of 57,000 vehicles crossing daily, The junction has the intersection of two national highways of NH 16 and NH 65.

Rail 

Vijayawada Junction railway station was established in the year 1888. It is one of the busiest stations of Indian Railways, the busiest railway station in South India, and is classified as a Non-Suburban Grade-2 (NSG-2) station in Vijayawada railway division. A train route connecting Vijayawada and Hyderabad was laid in 1889. Suburban rail services are operated from the railway station to the nearby cities of Guntur and Tenali. The city houses the headquarters of Vijayawada railway division, one of the three railway divisions of South Coast Railway zone. The station has also a diesel and electric loco sheds which have a capacity of holding 220 locos by both the sheds.

Suburban and high speed rail 
A proposed circular train connectivity would connect Vijayawada with neighbouring cities of Eluru, Guntur, Tenali, Mangalagiri and the state capital, Amaravati.

Metro rail System 
A 66km light transit system is proposed to connect the city with Amaravathi and its surrounding suburbs.The metro project is implemented by a special purpose vehicle named as, Amaravati Metro Rail Corporation. Amaravati Metro Rail Corporation has been renamed as Andhra Pradesh Metro Rail Corporation Ltd after the Managing Director of AMRC suggested that it might be appropriate to change the name AMRC as APMRC so as to implement the Metro Projects in other parts of the State and the ruling government obliged.

Air 

The Vijayawada Airport at Gannavaram provides air connectivity to major metropolitan cities of the country. On 3 May 2017, the airport was upgraded from domestic to international. Currently, Air India, Jet Airways and Spice Jet are operating in the Vijayawada Airport. International flights started from 4 December 2018 by Indigo Airlines to Singapore. The international flights to Singapore stopped after 27 June 2019 because the State Government stopped Viability Gap Funding in June 2019. , it registered a domestic passenger movement growth rate of 70.0% with a total of 11 Lakh 92 Thousand Passengers in FY 19. Aircraft movement recorded a growth of 65.0%.

Education 

The Primary and Secondary School Education is imparted by the Government, Aided and Private Schools, under the State School Education Department. As per the school information report for the academic year 2015–16, the city has 133,837 students enrolled in 529 Schools. The state and CBSE syllabus are followed by schools for the Secondary School Certificate. The languages of instruction are English, Urdu and Telugu.

For 10+2 education, there are two government junior colleges, namely S.R.R. & C.V.R. Government College and Government Junior College (at Vinchipeta); a railway junior college; three co-operative, 12 private aided, including the oldest, S.R.R & C.V.R College (established in 1937), Andhra Loyola College (established in December 1953), Maria Stella College for Girls (established in 1962),K.B.N College (established in 1965), Velagapudi Ramakrishna Siddhartha Engineering College (established in 1977), the oldest engineering college in Andhra Pradesh, and many private unaided colleges. School of Planning and Architecture, Vijayawada (SPAV) was established in 2008, a higher education institute in Vijayawada. It is one of the three Schools of Planning and Architecture (SPAs) established by the Ministry of Human Resource Development in 2008 as an autonomous institute and a fully central funded institution.

The Sarvotthama Grandhalaya is a city library established on 30 March 1987. It serves an average daily readership of 200, equipped with 22,000 books related to many fields. VMC & VBFS Research and Reference Library is a reader's room/library maintained by Vijayawada Book Festival Society.

Media 

Visalaandhra was the first newspaper in the state, started from Vijayawada. As per the 58th annual report of Press India 2013–14, the large and medium Telugu daily publications from Vijayawada include Andhra Jyothy, Eenadu, Sakshi, Suryaa, Andhra Prabha, Vaartha, Prajasakti, and Udaya Bharatam. The English publications are Deccan Chronicle, The Hindu, The Times of India, The Hans India, News Boom, The Fourth Voice, and Views Observer.

The All India Radio Vijayawada was commissioned on 1 December 1948. Its building was named after Pingali Venkayya, the designer of the Indian flag. The channels broadcast by All India Radio are Rainbow Krishnaveni FM, Vividh Bharati. Telugu Doordarshan Saptagiri is located here.

Sports 

Indira Gandhi Stadium in the city is the headquarters of the Sports Authority of Andhra Pradesh. It hosted its only men's One Day International (ODI) on 24 November 2002, played between India and West Indies.

The only women's ODI was hosted on 12 December 1997, played as a group match of 1997 Women's Cricket World Cup between England women's and Pakistan women's teams. Makineni Basavapunnaiah Stadium at Ajit Singh Nagar is another stadium that caters the sporting needs of the northern part of the city. Indoor stadiums include Dandamudi Rajagopala Rao Indoor Stadium (DRRIS) at M. G.Road and Chennupati Ramakotaiah Indoor Stadium (CRIS) at Patamatalanka. The DRRIS was named after the former weightlifter, Dandamudi Rajagopal Rao, who participated in the 1951 Asian Games and the 1956 Olympics. The DRRIS hosted several national and international sporting events, such as the 79th Senior Badminton Champions.

Andhra Cricket Association (ACA) International Cricket Stadium is being built on a  site at Navuluru village, Mangalagiri Mandal of Guntur district,  from the city. It serves as the Andhra Cricket Association stadium. Vijaya Madhavi Tennis Academy is in Loyola College. Loyola College Grounds hosted many national-level events which includes a Ranji match.

The Railway Sports Stadium, near the railway station, hosted several national level railway competitions such as bodybuilding competitions, Under-19 Cricket championships and a few non-railway events. This stadium has a gallery facility of over 10,000 people. Makineni Basava Punnaiah stadium is another open stadium in the city. Dandamudi Rajagopal Rao Indoor Stadium is one of the noted Badminton stadiums in Andhra Pradesh. It has hosted several national level Badminton and Table Tennis championships.

Awards
The Swachh Survekashan 2021 has identified Vijayawada as the third cleanest city in the nation. In the category of cities with more than 10 lakh inhabitants, the city rose from sixth place in 2020 to third place this year. A five-star designation for "Garbage Free City" has also been given to Vijayawada. Such a good ranking can be accredited to policy measures such as the introduction of waste disposal vehicles in the city by N. Chandrababu Naidu

Notable people 
Notable people born in, or associated with, the city include:

Nadeem Baig – Pakistani actor, singer and producer
Saraswathi Gora – Indian social activist who served as leader of the Atheist Centre
Koneru Humpy - reigning women's world rapid Chess champion
Lavanam – social reformer and Gandhian
Prasad Murella, Indian film cinematographer
Ayyadevara Kaleswara Rao - Indian freedom fighter and the first Speaker of the Legislative Assembly of Andhra Pradesh.
Goparaju Ramachandra Rao – founder of Atheist Centre
Kanuri Lakshmana Rao – Three time MP from Vijayawada and Chief Engineer of Nagarjuna Sagar Dam
N. T. Rama Rao – founder of Telugu Desam Party and actor in Telugu films
Viswanatha Satyanarayana- awarded the Jnanpith Award in 1970, the first for a Telugu writer, and Padma Bhushan in 1971
Puchalapalli Sundarayya – founding member of Communist party (Marxist) and former MLA from Vijayawada
Pingali Venkayya – creator of National Flag.                      *Dandamudi Rajagopal Rao - Weightlifting, Olympics .

See also 
 List of neighbourhoods in Vijayawada
 List of educational institutions in Vijayawada-Guntur Region
 List of most populous cities in India
 List of cities in Andhra Pradesh by population
Andhra Pradesh Reorganisation Act, 2014

References

External links 

 Vijayawada Municipal Corporation website 
 

 
Cities in Andhra Pradesh
Cities and towns in NTR district
Cities in Andhra Pradesh Capital Region
Metropolitan cities in India
Buddhist pilgrimage sites in India
Archaeological sites in Andhra Pradesh
Ancient Indian cities
Hindu holy cities
Former capital cities in India